Group C of the 2001 Fed Cup Europe/Africa Zone Group II was one of four pools in the Europe/Africa zone of the 2001 Fed Cup. Five teams competed in a round robin competition, with the top team advancing to Group I for 2002.

Bosnia and Herzegovina vs. Egypt

Armenia vs. Kenya

Bosnia and Herzegovina vs. Lesotho

Egypt vs. Armenia

Bosnia and Herzegovina vs. Kenya

Egypt vs. Lesotho

Bosnia and Herzegovina vs. Armenia

Lesotho vs. Kenya

Egypt vs. Kenya

Armenia vs. Lesotho

  placed first in this group and thus advanced to Group I for 2002, where they placed last in their pool of four, and was thus relegated back to Group II for 2003.

See also
Fed Cup structure

References

External links
 Fed Cup website

2001 Fed Cup Europe/Africa Zone